The Agreement on the Privileges and Immunities of the International Criminal Court is a treaty that was adopted by the Assembly of States Parties to the International Criminal Court on 9 September 2002. The treaty provides certain privileges and immunities to officials and staff of the International Criminal Court in order for them to perform their duties impartially. The treaty entered into force on 22 July 2004 after it was ratified by ten states.

States parties 
Currently there are 79 states parties to the Agreement. Although the Agreement is open to all states, Ukraine is the only state that has ratified the Agreement but not the Rome Statute of the International Criminal Court.

Signatories which have not ratified

Notes

References

External links
 International Criminal Court: Agreement on the Privileges and Immunities of the International Criminal Court. Retrieved 2011-05-07.

International Criminal Court
Treaties concluded in 2002
Treaties entered into force in 2004
Treaties of Albania
Treaties of Andorra
Treaties of Argentina
Treaties of Austria
Treaties of Belgium
Treaties of Belize
Treaties of Benin
Treaties of Bolivia
Treaties of Bosnia and Herzegovina
Treaties of Botswana
Treaties of Brazil
Treaties of Bulgaria
Treaties of Burkina Faso
Treaties of Canada
Treaties of the Central African Republic
Treaties of Chile
Treaties of Colombia
Treaties of Costa Rica
Treaties of Croatia
Treaties of Cyprus
Treaties of the Czech Republic
Treaties of the Democratic Republic of the Congo
Treaties of Denmark
Treaties of the Dominican Republic
Treaties of Ecuador
Treaties of Estonia
Treaties of Finland
Treaties of France
Treaties of Gabon
Treaties of Georgia (country)
Treaties of Germany
Treaties of Greece
Treaties of Guyana
Treaties of Honduras
Treaties of Hungary
Treaties of Iceland
Treaties of Ireland
Treaties of Italy
Treaties of Latvia
Treaties of Lesotho
Treaties of Liberia
Treaties of Liechtenstein
Treaties of Lithuania
Treaties of Luxembourg
Treaties of Malawi
Treaties of Malta
Treaties of Mexico
Treaties of Moldova
Treaties of Mongolia
Treaties of Montenegro
Treaties of Namibia
Treaties of the Netherlands
Treaties of New Zealand
Treaties of North Macedonia
Treaties of Norway
Treaties of the State of Palestine
Treaties of Panama
Treaties of Paraguay
Treaties of Poland
Treaties of Portugal
Treaties of South Korea
Treaties of Romania
Treaties of Samoa
Treaties of Senegal
Treaties of Serbia and Montenegro
Treaties of Slovakia
Treaties of Slovenia
Treaties of Spain
Treaties of Sweden
Treaties of Switzerland
Treaties of Trinidad and Tobago
Treaties of Tunisia
Treaties of Uganda
Treaties of Ukraine
Treaties of the United Kingdom
Treaties of Uruguay
Treaties of Mali
International criminal law treaties
Diplomatic immunity and protection treaties
Treaties extended to the Netherlands Antilles
Treaties extended to Aruba
Treaties extended to Anguilla
Treaties extended to Bermuda
Treaties extended to the British Virgin Islands
Treaties extended to the Cayman Islands
Treaties extended to the Falkland Islands
Treaties extended to Montserrat
Treaties extended to the Pitcairn Islands
Treaties extended to Saint Helena, Ascension and Tristan da Cunha
Treaties extended to Akrotiri and Dhekelia
Treaties extended to the Turks and Caicos Islands
Treaties extended to the Isle of Man
Treaties extended to Gibraltar